"Mobile Homer" is the seventeenth season premiere of the American animated television series The Simpsons. It was first broadcast on the Fox network in the United States on May 1, 2005. In the episode, Marge saves money for life insurance, worried about Homer after a near-fatal incident and his bad medical history. Angered by his wife's new measures to cut back financially, Homer spends the savings on a motor home, which he spends most of his time in and causes a rift between them.

The Simpsons had been canceled in 2004 due to low ratings, but was revived by Fox after became the cable network's most watched program, and more than three million DVDs of the show were sold. The episode was written by Tim Long, and was the first to be directed by Raymond S. Persi, much of the plot and many of the technical aspects of the episode. The episode contains many cultural references; in the cold episode Peter 29 lists that were canceled by Fox after The Simpsons was canceled and says that if all of those shows were to be canceled, they might have a chance at returning.

Plot
In the cold open, Peter tells his family that they have "been canceled". He then lists all 29 shows that were canceled by Fox between the show's cancellation and revival and says that if all of those shows were to be canceled, they might have a chance at returning.

While Marge takes the children on a leisurely Sunday afternoon drive (that the kids don't enjoy), Homer is forced to clean the garage at home. He accidentally gets spiders in his throat, and his neck is almost crushed by the garage door. When his family gets home, a suffocated Homer is saved by CPR by Lisa and Bart (via wrestling). After the incident, Marge insists that the family buy life insurance, but Homer is deemed impossible to insure because of his poor medical history; even boasting that he smokes to impress the consultant, a lie that fails to convince her. After watching a melodramatic "inspired by real-life" made-for-TV film, Marge decides to save money in a very paranoid way by buying imitation brands of cereal and coffee, and convinces Maggie to conserve her pacifier. Homer, however, becomes upset with Marge's petty attitude (especially when she will not let him spend even false money to buy a single beer) and tries to argue with Marge, remarking that he has the right to use at least a part of the money since he brings it home, but she denies his request, retorting that he does nothing in his job. Homer, now angry about Marge's new measures, takes the money she has saved and makes a down payment on a new motor home. After he buys his motor home, Marge tells Homer to enjoy it because she is not speaking to him.

Homer starts living in the RV, and he and Marge compete for the loyalty of Bart and Lisa. Homer's childlike ways give him an advantage. Homer discovers a convoy of RVs at a gas station, and he invites them to stay in his backyard. Marge, annoyed with their behavior, cuts off their electricity, causing Homer's newfound friends to ditch him. Homer and Marge proceed to get into an all night argument, to the point of Homer calling Marge's bed "a loveless slab of bossiness", and fearing that his parents could split up, Bart decides that he and Lisa should return the RV to the dealership for a full refund, and Lisa agrees.

Discovering that the children and RV are gone, Homer and Marge give chase in the car. Bart and Lisa accidentally get on the freeway and force their parents to kiss before they will pull over. But after they kiss, Bart asks Homer to raise his allowance, which angers Homer, who in turn strangles Bart. Lisa starts to lose control of the RV, which plunges off an uncompleted runaway truck ramp onto a Turkish container ship. The ship is leaving the port, but Marge convinces the captain to turn around after offering him 300 cans of mushroom soup she bought on sale. With their marriage restored, Homer tells Marge that he will return the RV in the morning for the refund, and uses the ship's crane to put the vehicle on a nearby pier. The RV's weight is too much for the pier to handle. So it collapses and sinks in the harbor, much to Homer's dismay, while Marge is unconcerned about the loss of money, because the Turkish sailors put a small amount of hashish in her food to keep her temporarily content.

Song
During the scene with the other RV owners in his backyard, a member of the RV convoy sings a version of Geoff Mack's I've Been Everywhere.

Istanbul (not Constantinople) is featured at the end of the episode, referring to the Turks that picked them up at the end on their cargo ship.

Reception
In its original broadcast, "Mobile Homer" acquired a Nielsen rating of 8.6, and was viewed in 8.6 million households.

Walter J. Keegan, Jr. of TV Squad thought that the episode did not have enough laughs, but did have enough subtle Simpsons humor about SUVs, Turkish sailors, and evil religious icons. He also thought that the idea of Marge filling the viewers in on what Homer does at work (since he is not seen there a lot anymore) was good, while his most puzzling moment was Bart's drawing of Homer.

References

External links 
 

The Simpsons (season 17) episodes
2005 American television episodes